Ficano is an Italian surname. Notable people with the surname include:

Nicola Ficano (born 1987), Italian footballer
Robert A. Ficano (born 1952), American politician

See also
Fiano (disambiguation)

Italian-language surnames